VTV9 – Binh Dien International Women's Volleyball Cup is an international women's volleyball tournament organised by the Vietnam Volleyball Federation, and sponsored by VTV9 and Binh Dien Fertilizer Company. The cup was established in 2006.

Results

Medal table

MVP by edition
 2006 –  Phạm Thị Kim Huệ
 2007 –  Yaowalak Mahaon
 2008 –  Pleumjit Thinkaow
 2010 –  Nguyễn Thị Ngọc Hoa
 2011 –  Phạm Thị Kim Huệ
 2012 –  Nguyễn Thị Ngọc Hoa
 2013 –  Đỗ Thị Minh
 2014 –  Nguyễn Thị Xuân
 2015 –  Jong Jin Sim
 2016 –  Yang Wenjin
 2017 –  Jong Jin Sim
 2018 –  Holly Toliver
 2019 –  Lindsay Stalzer

References
 http://vtvbinhdiencup.vn/

 
International women's volleyball competitions
Women's volleyball in Vietnam
International volleyball competitions hosted by Vietnam
Recurring sporting events established in 2006
2006 establishments in Vietnam